Pokémon 3: The Movie – Spell of the Unown: Entei is a 2000 Japanese anime film directed by Kunihiko Yuyama as the third film in the Pokémon franchise. The film stars the voices of Rica Matsumoto, Ikue Ōtani, Mayumi Iizuka, Yūji Ueda, Koichi Yamadera, Megumi Hayashibara, Shin-ichiro Miki, Ai Kato, Masami Toyoshima, Akiko Yajima, and Naoto Takenaka.

Like its predecessors, it is preceded by a short film, this one titled Pikachu & Pichu, which marks the debut of the mischievous Pichu Bros., who help Pikachu reunite with his trainer after being separated (without Ash even knowing, due to him preparing a party to celebrate the day Pikachu and he first met). This was also the first Pokémon film to premiere in an IMAX theater. The realistic crystallization and Unown created a 3D effect in the film. This was also the last Pokémon film to be released internationally by Warner Bros. until the release of Pokémon: Detective Pikachu in 2019. The Japanese opening theme is OK! 2000 by Rica Matsumoto, and the Japanese ending theme is The Day a Rainbow Was Born (Niji ga Umareta hi) by Kumiko Mori. The English opening theme is Pokemon Johto by PJ Lequerica, and the English ending theme is To Know the Unknown by Innosense.

Plot

Pikachu & Pichu 
Pikachu and his friends are left on a skyscraper in a Big City by their trainers, who go off to prepare an unknown surprise for the Pokémon. Pikachu meets the Pichu Brothers, saving the younger one from falling off an opposite building. A group of Murkrow chase Pikachu off a flagpole, and he uses a group of Hoppip to reach the other side, sending Meowth who is window-cleaning, flying into a billboard. The Pichu Bros. assist Pikachu to return to his friends but they end up going on a journey across the city to the Pichu Bros' playground. On the way, they get chased by a Houndour whom they later encounter again. The angry Houndour chases the three around until he nearly knocks the playground over. Pikachu, the Pichu Bros., Houndour and their assortment of friends manage to save the playground. Pikachu realizes it is nearly six o'clock and he must return to his friends before Ash, his trainer, does. Pikachu and the Pichu Bros. use a tire to get to the building, sending Meowth flying again. The three arrive in the nick of time, the Pichu Brothers departing. Ash, Misty and Brock arrive and take the Pokémon into a room where a party has been laid out for them in celebration of the first anniversary of Ash and Pikachu's meeting.

In 2009, the short's Japanese narrator, Sakai Noriko was arrested for drug possession and substance abuse. Ever since then, the short has not been released on any home media format and was even excluded from the 2010 Pikachu The Movie Premium boxset.

Spell of the Unown 
In the town of Greenfield, research scientist Professor Spencer Hale conducts research on the elusive Unown. He and his assistant, Skyler, discover a site of ruins, but Hale is sucked into the dimension of the Unown.

His disappearance leaves his young daughter Molly alone, her mother having disappeared previously. Molly finds a box of tablets containing Unown images and begins assembling the letters, which summons the Unown themselves. The Unown use their powers to make Molly's wishes come true, transforming her manor house into a crystal-like palace which spreads across the town and cuts her off from the world. An illusionary Entei is created to represent Molly's father. Various people come to help sort out the Unown, including Professor Oak and Delia Ketchum (Ash's mother).

Meanwhile, Ash and his friends meet and befriend a trainer named Lisa. They come into Greenfield in the process and agree to join in the rescue mission to save young Molly. However, Entei kidnaps Delia, following Molly's request for a mother as well. Entei's powers hypnotize Delia into thinking she is Molly's mother. Ash, Misty, Brock and their Pokémon head out to the mansion to save Delia, communicating with Oak and Skyler thanks to a PokéGear device given to them by Lisa. Team Rocket try investigating the mansion, but Entei blasts them into the depths of the mansion. Molly watches Ash's Bulbasaur and Chikorita in action through a television and falls asleep, imagining herself being a Pokémon Trainer. Seeing Ash on TV, Delia snaps out of her trance; however, Entei creates a dream version of Molly as an adult and takes her to battle the three. Molly first fights Brock, but Molly's dreamed-up Pokémon are stronger than his; Molly then has a more friendly fight against Misty in an underwater battle.

Ash locates Molly and Delia, and implores Entei to return his mother. Entei refuses, easily defeats Totodile and Cyndaquil, and tries killing Ash and Pikachu. Having witnessed the crisis on TV in Charicific Valley, Charizard rescues Ash and Pikachu. Entei engages Charizard in a duel and eventually tries to kill him. However, Molly (who now sees that her actions are causing more harm than good) thwarts Entei and tells him to stop fighting. Ash and his friends convince Molly to leave with them, Entei revealing he was created by the Unown to be her father.

The Unown suddenly lose control of their powers and start to seal the group in the mansion. Ash, Pikachu, Charizard, Misty, Togepi, Brock, Delia, Molly and Team Rocket escape down to the hall where the Unown are. Pikachu and Charizard attempt to break the forcefield protecting the Unown, but they are unsuccessful—until they are joined by Entei, combining their powers to destroy the shield with Molly's support. Entei sacrifices himself and the Unown return to their dimension, reversing all of their effects on the world and returning Hale to the ruins where he originally vanished.

The group ventures outside, where Oak, Skyler, Lisa and others meet them. Team Rocket hides in the mansion upon seeing the police outside and declare that they will always have another opportunity to catch Pokémon. Charizard and Lisa depart from Ash's company, and Molly reunites with her father as well as with her long-lost mother.

Cast 

 Officer Jenny has no lines in the film despite her prominence.

Release

Theatrical run 
Pokémon 3: The Movie was released in Japanese theaters on July 8, 2000 by Toho. That following year, the English version was produced by Nintendo and 4Kids Entertainment and licensed by Warner Bros. under the Kids' WB banner, was released in North America on April 6, 2001. The events of the film take place during the third season of Pokémon: The Johto Journeys.

Home media 
Pokémon 3: The Movie was released on VHS and DVD on August 21, 2001.

A limited edition Blu-ray Steelbook containing the first three Pokémon films was released on February 9, 2016, along with single releases on DVD (These are: Pokémon: The First Movie, Pokémon: The Movie 2000 and Pokémon 3: The Movie). In accommodation with the 20th anniversary of the Pokémon franchise, a digitally remastered version of the film was released on iTunes, Amazon and Google Play on February 27, 2016.

Reception

Box office 
Like its predecessors, for the film's theatrical release, select theaters would give away exclusive Pokémon trading cards, to capitalize on the success of the trading card game.

Pokémon 3: The Movie opened in theaters in Japan on July 8, 2000 with a 74-minute running time.

The film was released in the United States on April 6, 2001, debuting at number 4 on its opening weekend, earning $8,240,752 from 2,675 theaters, less than half as much as first-place finisher Spy Kids. The film proved less successful in the box office compared to previous films. During its 10-week box office run, Pokémon 3: The Movie made a significant profit-margin, grossing $17,052,128 in North America.

The film grossed US$4,605,214 in five other countries, including US$2,736,100 in Germany, US$714,016 in the United Kingdom, US$549,902 in Australia, US$327,752 in Austria, and US$277,444 in Denmark. Combined, the film grossed  overseas outside of Japan.

Critical response 
The review aggregator website Rotten Tomatoes reported that 21% of critics have given the film a positive review based on 57 reviews, with an average rating of 4.01/10. The website's critics consensus reads, "Critics say that the third Pokemon movie has a better plot than its two predecessors. This is not enough, however, to recommend it to those not already fans of the franchise." On Metacritic, the film has a weighted average score of 22 out of 100 based on 18 critics, indicating "generally unfavorable reviews". Audiences polled by CinemaScore gave the film an average grade of "A−" on an A+ to F scale.

Soundtrack 

Pokémon 3: The Ultimate Soundtrack is the soundtrack to the third series and the movie, It was released on April 3, 2001 by Koch Records on Audio CD and Compact Cassette. Many of the songs were featured on the album Totally Pokémon but as that was not released outside of North America and Australia, this soundtrack encouraged European fans to own the music. In Australia, some copies of the CD were released with a bonus disc of the musical score album for Pokémon: The Movie 2000 (which was also released as a separate disc worldwide). The Japanese and English-language editions contained different tracks. Shinji Miyazaki wrote the original film score, while Ralph Schuckett composed the score for the International and Japanese DVD releases.

The second track, "To Know the Unknown", was performed by girl group Innosense. Tracks 13 to 15 were karaoke versions. The album also features two Pokémon videos, the Pokérap and a scene from the film, which are accessible upon insertion of the disc into a computer.

Track listing

See also 
 List of films based on video games

Notes

References

External links 

 
 
 

2000 anime films
2000s Japanese-language films
3: The Movie
Films about parallel universes
Toho animated films
Films directed by Kunihiko Yuyama
IMAX films
Japanese animated fantasy films
Japanese fantasy adventure films
Japanese sequel films
Films scored by Shinji Miyazaki
OLM, Inc. animated films